Leptopoecile is a genus of birds in the long-tailed tit family Aegithalidae. The genus was once placed in the large family Sylviidae, but analysis of mitochondrial DNA placed it with the long-tailed tits.

The genus contains two species:

References

 
Aegithalidae
Bird genera
Taxonomy articles created by Polbot